The 1959 Colorado State College Bears baseball team represented Colorado State College in the 1959 NCAA University Division baseball season. The Bears played their home games at Jackson Field. The team was coached by Pete Butler in his 17th year at Colorado State College.

The Bears won the District VII playoff to advanced to the College World Series, where they were defeated by the Clemson Tigers.

Roster

Schedule 

! style="" | Regular Season
|- valign="top" 

|- align="center" bgcolor="#ccffcc"
| 1 || March 18 || at  || Lobo Field • Albuquerque, New Mexico || 8–6 || 1–0 || –
|- align="center" bgcolor="#ffcccc"
| 2 || March 20 || at Arizona || UA Field • Tucson, Arizona || 4–6 || 1–1 || –
|- align="center" bgcolor="#ccffcc"
| 3 || March 21 || at Arizona || UA Field • Tucson, Arizona || 6–2 || 2–1 || –
|- align="center" bgcolor="#ffcccc"
| 4 || March 21 || at Arizona || UA Field • Tucson, Arizona || 1–5 || 2–2 || –
|- align="center" bgcolor="#ccffcc"
| 5 || March 23 || at New Mexico || Lobo Field • Albuquerque, New Mexico || 20–8 || 3–2 || –
|-

|- align="center" bgcolor="#ccffcc"
| 6 || April 2 ||  || Jackson Field • Greeley, Colorado || 12–3 || 4–2 || –
|- align="center" bgcolor="#ccffcc"
| 7 || April 4 ||  || Jackson Field • Greeley, Colorado || 15–1 || 5–2 || –
|- align="center" bgcolor="#ccffcc"
| 8 || April  ||  || Jackson Field • Greeley, Colorado || 12–6 || 6–2 || 1–0
|- align="center" bgcolor="#ccffcc"
| 9 || April 11 || at  || Colorado Field • Fort Collins, Colorado || 4–0 || 7–2 || 1–0
|- align="center" bgcolor="#ccffcc"
| 10 || April 17 || at  || Unknown • Laramie, Wyoming || 8–4 || 8–2 || 1–0
|- align="center" bgcolor="#ccffcc"
| 11 || April 18 || Wyoming || Jackson Field • Greeley, Colorado || 7–0 || 9–2 || 1–0
|- align="center" bgcolor="#ccffcc"
| 12 || April 21 ||  || Jackson Field • Greeley, Colorado || 7–0 || 10–2 || 1–0
|- align="center" bgcolor="#ccffcc"
| 13 || April 24 || at  || Stewart Field • Colorado Springs, Colorado || 22–14 || 11–2 || 2–0
|- align="center" bgcolor="#ccffcc"
| 14 || April 25 || at Colorado College || Stewart Field • Colorado Springs, Colorado || 29–13 || 12–2 || 3–0
|- align="center" bgcolor="#ccffcc"
| 15 || April 28 || Colorado Mines || Jackson Field • Greeley, Colorado || 13–1 || 13–2 || 4–0
|- align="center" bgcolor="#ccffcc"
| 16 || April 29 || Colorado Mines || Jackson Field • Greeley, Colorado || 5–1 || 14–2 || 5–0
|-

|- align="center" bgcolor="#ffcccc"
| 17 || May 1 || at  || Unknown • Gunnison, Colorado || 5–8 || 14–3 || 5–1
|- align="center" bgcolor="#ccffcc"
| 18 || May 2 || at Western State || Unknown • Gunnison, Colorado || 9–0 || 15–3 || 6–1
|- align="center" bgcolor="#ccffcc"
| 19 || May 5 ||  || Jackson Field • Greeley, Colorado || 3–2 || 16–3 || 6–1
|- align="center" bgcolor="#ccffcc"
| 20 || May 8 ||  || Jackson Field • Greeley, Colorado || 4–2 || 17–3 || 7–1
|- align="center" bgcolor="#ccffcc"
| 21 || May 9 || Adams State || Jackson Field • Greeley, Colorado || 11–6 || 18–3 || 8–1
|- align="center" bgcolor="#ccffcc"
| 22 || May 12 || at Denver || Unknown • Denver, Colorado || 17–0 || 19–3 || 8–1
|- align="center" bgcolor="#ccffcc"
| 23 || May  || Colorado State || Jackson Field • Greeley, Colorado || 16–1 || 20–3 || 8–1
|- align="center" bgcolor="#ccffcc"
| 24 || May 15 || Colorado College || Jackson Field • Greeley, Colorado || 15–3 || 21–3 || 9–1
|- align="center" bgcolor="#ccffcc"
| 25 || May 16 || Colorado College || Jackson Field • Greeley, Colorado || 13–1 || 22–3 || 10–1
|- align="center" bgcolor="#ffcccc"
| 26 || May 19 || Regis || Jackson Field • Greeley, Colorado || 6–9 || 22–4 || 10–1
|-

|-
! style="" | Postseason
|- valign="top"

|- align="center" bgcolor="#ccffcc"
| 27 || May 30 ||  || Jackson Field • Greeley, Colorado || 17–8 || 23–4 || 10–1
|- align="center" bgcolor="#ffcccc"
| 28 || May 31 || Utah || Jackson Field • Greeley, Colorado || 8–13 || 23–5 || 10–1
|- align="center" bgcolor="#ccffcc"
| 29 || June 1 || Utah || Jackson Field • Greeley, Colorado || 12–8 || 24–5 || 10–1
|-

|- align="center" bgcolor="#ffcccc"
| 30 || June 13 || vs Fresno State || Omaha Municipal Stadium • Omaha, Nebraska || 5–6 || 24–6 || 10–1
|- align="center" bgcolor="#ffcccc"
| 31 || June 14 || vs Clemson || Omaha Municipal Stadium • Omaha, Nebraska || 1–7 || 24–7 || 10–1
|-

Awards and honors 
Don Herrick
 All-Rocky Mountain Conference Team
 Third Team All-American American Baseball Coaches Association

Joe Peck
 All-Rocky Mountain Conference Team

Carl Rohnke
 All-Rocky Mountain Conference Team

Paul Chamberlain
 All-Rocky Mountain Conference Team

Frank Carbajal
 All-Rocky Mountain Conference Team

Duane Banks
 All-Rocky Mountain Conference Team

John Koehler
 All-Rocky Mountain Conference Team

Floyd Acre
 All-Rocky Mountain Conference Team

References 

Northern Colorado Bears baseball seasons
Colorado State College Bears baseball
College World Series seasons
Colorado State College
Rocky Mountain Athletic Conference baseball champion seasons